Jakob Schneider (born 18 April 1994) is a German representative rower. He is a three time world champion and a member of the German men's eight—the Deutschlandachter— who are the incumbent world champions taking gold at the 2019 World Rowing Championships in Ottensheim, Austria. He rowed at five when the Deutschlandachter at the 2017 World Rowing Cup II set a world's best time of 5.18.68, still the standing world mark as of 2021.

International rowing career
Schneider's representative debut for Germany came in 2012 when he was selected to row in a junior German men's four which took a bronze medal at the 2012 Junior World Championships in Plovdiv. He did not represent at the international level in 2013 but in 2014 rowed in a coxless four which won a silver medal at the U23 World Championships in Linz, Austria. Both those underage medals wins were in crews with Johannes Weißenfeld with whom Schneider would later win his three senior world championships.

Schneider in 2015 was elevated to the German senior squad and into a coxed pair which won a silver medal at the 2015 World Rowing Championships in Aiguebelette.In 2016 he rowed in the German U23 men's eight which placed third at the World U23 Rowing Championships in Rotterdam. In 2017 the German men's eight was completely rebuilt after the 2016 Olympics, and Schneider secured the five seat and held it throughout their dominant season campaign, winning gold at the European Championships, two World Rowing Cups and ultimately at the 2017 World Rowing Championships in Sarasota, Florida where the German eight were crowned as world champions. In June 2017 at the World Rowing Cup II in Poznan they set a new world's best time for the eight, taking 0.67 seconds off a 2012 mark that had been set by Canada.  The German crew with every man holding the same seat, continued their European and world dominance throughout 2018 winning at three World Rowing Cups, the 2018 European Championships and then defending their world title at the 2018 World Rowing Championships in Plovdiv.  There were a handful of changes to the German eight in 2019 but Weißenfeld stayed in the engine room at five for another successful international season which culminated in his third successive world championship title at the 2019 World Rowing Championships in Ottensheim.

Their 2019 performances qualified that boat for Tokyo 2020. By the time of the 2021 selections for those delayed Olympics, Schneider was still in the crew and set to make his Olympic rowing debut.

References

External links

1994 births
Living people
German male rowers
World Rowing Championships medalists for Germany
People from Breisgau-Hochschwarzwald
Sportspeople from Freiburg (region)
Rowers at the 2020 Summer Olympics
Medalists at the 2020 Summer Olympics
Olympic medalists in rowing
Olympic silver medalists for Germany